ABSA Aerolinhas Brasileiras S/A d/b/a LATAM Cargo Brasil (formerly TAM Cargo) is a cargo airline based in Campinas, Brazil. It operates scheduled services within Latin America and between Brazil and the United States as well as charter services. Its main base is Viracopos International Airport. 

It is a sister company of LATAM Cargo Chile and LATAM Cargo Colombia.

History
The airline was established and started operations on June 2, 1995 as Brasil Transair - Transportes Charter Turismo. 

In November 2001, LAN Airlines acquired a majority stake of the company, which was then renamed ABSA Cargo Airline and integrated into the LAN Chile Group. ABSA Cargo put its first Boeing 767-300F into service in January 2002. It is owned by LAN Airlines (74%), Jochmann (13%) and TADEF (13%) and had 285 employees as of March 2007. 

On August 1, 2012, ABSA began trading as TAM Cargo after the absorption of TAM Linhas Aéreas by its parent LAN to form the LATAM Airlines Group. In May 2016, it has been rebranded to the current LATAM Cargo Brasil in line with LATAM Cargo Chile, the former LAN Cargo.

Destinations

LATAM Cargo Brasil serves the following:

Fleet

Current fleet

The LATAM Cargo Brasil fleet consists of the following aircraft (as of August 2019):

Former fleet
As ABSA Cargo, they previously operated the following aircraft:

See also
List of airlines of Brazil

References

Citations

Bibliography

External links

 Official website

Absa Aerolinhas Brasileiras
Airlines established in 1995
Cargo airlines of Brazil
LATAM Airlines Group
1995 establishments in Brazil
Companies based in Campinas
Brazilian brands